This is a list of broadcast television stations serving cities in the Canadian province of Manitoba
. In 2011, some of these stations switched to digital broadcast television.

Defunct stations
Channel 5: CKX-TV - CBC - Brandon

See also
List of television stations in Canada
Media in Canada

References

Manitoba

Television stations